The Evergreen S class is a series of 10 container ships built for Evergreen Marine. The Ships were built by Mitsubishi Heavy Industries at their Kobe shipyard in Japan. The ships have a maximum theoretical capacity of around 6,944 twenty-foot equivalent units (TEU).

List of ships

References 

Container ship classes